Tre Ford (born March 30, 1998) is a Canadian football quarterback for the Edmonton Elks of the Canadian Football League (CFL). He was named a Hec Crighton Trophy winner in 2021 as U Sports football's most outstanding player and won the Lois and Doug Mitchell Award as U Sports top male university athlete.

High school career
Ford played quarterback at A. N. Myer Secondary School where he led the Marauders to a Junior Metrobowl championship and three consecutive OFSAA championships.

University career
After being recruited by several U Sports football programs to play at a different position, Ford decided to commit to the Waterloo Warriors after head coach Chris Bertoia confirmed that the team wanted him to continue playing quarterback. In his first season in 2017, he split playing time with the incumbent starting quarterback, Lucas McConnell, and played in seven games where he completed 48 passes out of 72 attempts for 673 yards for six touchdowns and five interceptions. However, he also had 717 rushing yards, which was the 12th highest in the country, and four rushing touchdowns, which resulted in him being named the U Sports Rookie of the Year. After finishing winless in the two seasons previous, Ford helped the Warriors finish with a 4–4 record and a seventh place finish in the Ontario University Athletics (OUA) conference.

In 2018, Ford became the team's starting quarterback where he played in eight regular season games and passed for 2,822 yards, 27 touchdowns, and two interceptions with 74.1 completion percentage, which was the highest in OUA history. The team again finished with a 4–4 record, but qualified for the playoffs for the first time since 2003. In the 45–34 OUA quarter-final loss to the Guelph Gryphons, he completed 23 passes out of 32 attempts for 295 yards and three touchdowns and had 11 carries for 150 rushing yards and two touchdowns. At the end of the season, Ford was named the OUA Most Valuable Player.

Ford continued his strong play in the 2019 season as he again started in all eight regular season games where he passed for 2,158 yards with 13 touchdowns and seven interceptions. He also rushed for 634 yards and six touchdowns as the Warriors finished with another 4–4 record. In the playoffs, Ford led the Warriors to the team's first post-season victory since 1999 as the Warriors defeated the Ottawa Gee-Gees by a score of 44–21. However, the Warriors fell to the Mustangs in the OUA Semi-Final 30–24 after Ford had 226 yards passing with three touchdowns and two interceptions (including one that was returned for a touchdown) along with 72 rushing yards. For his outstanding season, Ford was named a U Sports Second Team All-Canadian.

With the 2020 U Sports football season cancelled due to the COVID-19 pandemic in Canada, Ford elected to defer his CFL Draft eligibility by one year to 2022 and returned to play for the Warriors in 2021. In just six regular season games, he completed 118 passes out of 186 attempts for 1,465 yards with 10 passing touchdowns and four interceptions and led the OUA in passing yards. He was also fourth in the country in rushing yards per game as he had 59 carries for 629 yards and three touchdowns. At the end of the season, he became the first Warriors player to win the Hec Crighton Trophy as the most outstanding football player in U Sports and was named a U Sports First Team All-Canadian. He was also the first Waterloo player to win the Lois and Doug Mitchell Award as U Sports top male university athlete for the 2021–22 season.

Despite having one more year of playing eligibility, Ford stated that his intention was to play professionally in 2022.

Following the completion of the 2022 CFL season Ford started working towards an MBA at Laurentian University. He is also a member of the university’s track team.

U Sports statistics

Professional career

Pre-draft process 
Ford was ranked as the fourth best player in the Canadian Football League's Amateur Scouting Bureau final rankings for players eligible in the 2022 CFL Draft, and first by players in U Sports. Due to his strong testing numbers at the University of Buffalo pro day where his 40-yard dash time of 4.45 was the best of any 2022 NFL Draft-eligible quarterback, there was also speculation that Ford would be signed by a National Football League team. While he was undrafted in the 2022 NFL Draft and was not signed by an NFL team, he received mini-camp invites from the Baltimore Ravens and New York Giants.

Edmonton Elks 
Ford was then drafted in the first round (8th overall) by the Edmonton Elks in the 2022 CFL Draft. On May 11, 2022, it was announced that Ford had signed with the Elks. With the Elks struggling to start the season (0-3), head coach Chris Jones announced that Ford would replace veteran Nick Arbuckle for the team's fourth game of the season against the Hamilton Tiger-Cats. Ford managed to lead the Elks to a narrow win, completing 15 of 26 passes for 159 yards with one touchdown and one interception. He also carried the ball six times gaining 61 yards on the ground. In his second career start Ford suffered a shoulder injury in the first quarter and was forced to leave the game. The following day it was announced that he would miss multiple weeks with a collarbone injury. In mid-September Edmonton Elks head coach Chris Jones confirmed that Tre Ford would return to the active lineup for the team's Week 15 matchup, with Taylor Cornelius remaining as the starter. Following the season Ford had a workout with the Las Vegas Raiders (NFL) in December 2022, and the New England Patriots in January 2023.

Personal life
Ford married his long-time fiancé, Anika Nadeau, on June 13, 2022. Ford has a twin brother, Tyrell Ford, who plays defensive back for the Winnipeg Blue Bombers and also played for the Waterloo Warriors. He began playing football when he was six years old when his father, Robert, introduced him to the sport and also served as his coach.

References

External links
Edmonton Elks bio
Waterloo Warriors bio

1998 births
Canadian football quarterbacks
Edmonton Elks players
Living people
Players of Canadian football from Ontario
Sportspeople from Niagara Falls, Ontario
Waterloo Warriors football players